Colin Marston (born September 13, 1982) is an American multi-instrumentalist musician and record producer residing in New York City. He graduated from New York University with a Bachelor of Arts degree in music technology in 2004, and runs Menegroth The Thousand Caves Recording Studios in Woodhaven, Queens while not on tour with one of a number of bands. He is also known for his performances in acts such as Behold... The Arctopus, Dysrhythmia, Krallice, and the reunion lineup of Gorguts. Marston has produced, mastered, and mixed music for artists such as Imperial Triumphant, Genghis Tron, Kayo Dot, Jarboe, Capillary Action, Origin, Panopticon, Altar of Plagues, Liturgy, Pyrrhon, and Orthrelm, as well as for his own bands.

Bands
Behold... The Arctopus - (technical metal with jazz influences).
Dysrhythmia - (experimental post rock).
Byla - (ambient/drone soundscapes with guitar melodies).
Krallice - (avant-garde/experimental/progressive black metal featuring Mick Barr of Orthrelm).
Indricothere - (Technical death metal with various metal influences and ambient soundscapes, formerly known as "Vegan Death").
Infidel? / Castro! - (abstract electroacoustic, conceptual metal with George Korein).
Gorguts -  (Technical death metal, bass in Gorguts reunion line up).
Domestigrind -  (grindcore)
Encenathrakh - (Technical death metal)

Performance Discography

Infidel?/Castro!
2000: Infidelicacy (Self-released/independent)
2001: Case Study In Bioentropy (Self-released/independent)
2003: Infidel?/Castro! And Friendly Bears  - A Split Experience (Epicene Sound Systems / Rice Control)
2005: Bioentropic Damage Fractal (Crucial Blast)

Behold... The Arctopus
2003: Arctopocalypse Now... Warmageddon Later (Epicene Sound Systems)
2005: Nano-Nucleonic Cyborg Summoning (Troubleman Unlimited)
2006: Split with Orthrelm  (Crucial Blast)
2007: Memphis 6-3-06 (s.l.a.p.)
2007: Skullgrid (Black Market Activities)
2012: Horrorscension (Black Market Activities)
2016: Cognitive Emancipation
2020: Hapeleptic Overtrove

Byla
2005: Byla (Translation Loss Records)
2007: Byla + Jarboe  - Viscera (Translation Loss Records)

Dysrhythmia
2006: Barriers And Passages (Relapse Records)
2007: Split with Rothko  - Fractures (Acerbic Noise Development)
2009: Psychic Maps (Relapse Records)
2012: Test of Submission (Profound Lore)
2016: The Veil of Control (Profound Lore)
2019: Terminal Threshold

Solo
2007: Colin Marston - 200220032004 (Self-released/independent)
2007: Indricothere - Indricothere (The Sacrosanct Opuscule)
2013: Indricothere - II (Self-released/independent; vinyl on Gilead Media)
2013: Indricothere - XI (Self-released/independent)
2015: Indricothere - Plagued (Self-released/independent)
2015: Indricothere - XI. (Self-released/independent)
2016: Indricothere - III. (Self-released/independent)

Krallice
2008: Krallice (Profound Lore Records)
2009: Dimensional Bleedthrough (Profound Lore Records)
2011: Diotima (Profound Lore Records)
2012: Years Past Matter (Self-released/independent; vinyl on Gilead Media)
2015: Ygg huur (Self-released/independent; vinyl on Gilead Media)
2016: Hyperion (EP) (Self-released/independent; vinyl on Gilead Media)
2016: Prelapsarian (Self-released/independent; vinyl on Gilead Media)
2017: Loüm (Self-released/independent; vinyl on Gilead Media)
2017: Go Be Forgotten (Self-released/independent; vinyl on Gilead Media)
2019: Wolf EP (Self-released)
2020: Mass Cathexis (Gilead Media)
2021: Demonic Wealth (Self-released)
2022: Crystalline Exhaustion (Self-released)
2022: Psychagogue (Self-released)

Sailors With Wax Wings
2010: Sailors With Wax Wings (Angel Oven Records)

Pyramids
2009: Pyramids With Nadja (Hydra Head Records)
2015: A Northern Meadow (Profound Lore Records)

So Is The Tongue
2012: Child of Divorce (Nefarious Industries) - Warr Guitar

East of the Wall
2018: Farmer's Almanac (Nefarious Industries) - Warr Guitar

Gorguts
2013: Colored Sands (Season of Mist)
2016: Pleiades' Dust (Season of Mist)

Sabbath Assembly
2014: Quaternity (Svart Records)

Encenathrakh
(All self-released)
2013: Respekt the Demo
2015: Encenathrakh
2019: The 2 Song Promo 19
2020: Live Album 
2020: Thraakethraaeate Thraithraake
2021: Studio Album
2022: Ithate Thngth Oceate

Withered
2016: Grief Relic (Season of Mist) - Bass

M Lamar & Mivos Quartet
2017: Surveillance Punishment and the Black Psyche - Guitar

Panopticon
2019: The Crescendo of Dusk (Bindrune Recordings) - Additional Keys

References

External links
The Thousand Caves Recording Studios

1982 births
Living people
Record producers from New York (state)
Steinhardt School of Culture, Education, and Human Development alumni
American heavy metal guitarists
American heavy metal bass guitarists
American black metal musicians
Death metal musicians
American experimental guitarists
American male bass guitarists
Progressive metal bass guitarists
Guitarists from Philadelphia
Guitarists from New York City
Gorguts members
Behold... The Arctopus members
Record producers from Pennsylvania
21st-century American bass guitarists
21st-century American male musicians